Quatre Bras (French: Quatre Bras de Tervueren; Dutch: Vierarmenkruispunt) is  a cross roads in Tervuren between the Avenue de Tervueren (Brussels-Tervuren road) and the Brussels outer ring R0.  It is a key location for car traffic around Brussels.

References

Roads in Belgium
Tervuren